"In Due Time" is the lead single from Killswitch Engage's sixth studio album, Disarm the Descent. The song is the band's first single to feature vocalist Jesse Leach since 2003's "The Element of One". The song charted at no. 23 on the Active rock chart and no. 26 on the Mainstream Rock chart.

The song was nominated for Best Metal Performance at the 2014 Grammy Awards.

Music video
The song's music video shows the band performing the song in the studio. It was directed by Ian McFarland and Mike Pecci and released February 27, 2013.

Jesse Leach has stated that the video's concept was inspired by the early music videos for Foo Fighters.

Reception
Loudwire named "In Due Time" one of the best metal songs of 2013.

Track listing

Personnel
Jesse Leach – lead vocals
Adam Dutkiewicz – lead guitar, backing vocals
Joel Stroetzel – rhythm guitar
Mike D'Antonio – bass
Justin Foley – drums

References

Killswitch Engage songs
2013 songs
2013 singles
Roadrunner Records singles